The Perrin River is a  tidal river in the U.S. state of Virginia. It is a small inlet on the north shore of the York River near that river's mouth at Chesapeake Bay.

See also
List of rivers of Virginia

References

USGS Hydrologic Unit Map - State of Virginia (1974)

Rivers of Virginia
Tributaries of the York River (Virginia)